The Reform Government of New Zealand was the government of New Zealand from 1912 to 1928. It is perhaps best remembered for its anti-trade union stance in the Waihi miners' strike of 1912 and a dockworkers' strike the following year. It also governed during World War I, during which a temporary coalition was formed with the Liberal Party.

Significant policies

Industrial
 Sided with employers in the 1912 Waihi miners' strike and the waterfront workers' strike of 1913. In the latter strike, civilians enrolled as 'special constables' became known as 'Massey's Cossacks'.
 The Board of Trade Act (1919) gave government the power to regulate industries "in the interests of economic welfare".

Public service
 The Public Service Act (1912) put a commissioner at the head of the public service and replaced political patronage over appointments and inconsistency between departments with ‘scientific management’

Health
 Compulsory medical inspection of schoolchildren was introduced (1912).
 A minimum drinking age of 21 was introduced (1914).
 A Board of Health was set up (1920).

Welfare
 A juvenile probation scheme was established (1913).
 Widow's pensions were extended to the wives of mental hospital patients (1912).
 From 1914 onwards, a dependent child's exemption for income tax purposes was provided.
 The Miners Phthisis Act (1915) introduced pensions for completely incapacitated victims of pneumoconiosis.
 Pensions were introduced for miners' widows (1915).
 The War Pensions Act of 1915 introduced war widows pensions, which were paid without a means test from 1916 onwards.
 The Housing Act (1919) specified sums of government money "that local authorities could borrow to erect workers' dwellings".
 The war pensions system was extended (1919).
 Women were made eligible for Parliament (1919).
 Pensions for the blind were introduced (1924).
 Family allowances were introduced for the second child onwards (1926).
 Legislation was introduced (1922) which increasingly placed farm products under the control of boards.
 Children's Courts were established (1925).
 Borstal institutions were established (1924).
 The Child Welfare Act 1925 introduced compulsory inquiries into the living circumstances of all children born outside marriage.

Education

 The Education Act (1914) made it compulsory for public secondary schools to take free-place pupils.
 The school-leaving age was raised to 14 (1914).

Foreign affairs and military
 Brought New Zealand into World War I with Britain and the Allies, see Military history of New Zealand in World War I.
 Introduced conscription in 1916, following registration of male residents between 17 and 60 under the National Registration Act, 1915.

Formation

From the start of representative government in New Zealand, in the mid nineteenth century, until the 1890s, New Zealand governments were not formed on a party basis but were rather loose and shifting groups of individuals. In the 1880s and 1890s a group of politicians formed themselves into New Zealand's first true political party, the Liberals, which became the Liberal government in 1890. It remained in power for more than two decades, testimony not only to its popular policies and dynamic leadership but also to its organisation and party structure.

The opposition was initially disorganised and fractured. John Bryce was briefly recognised as Leader of the Opposition in 1891, then William Rolleston from 1891 to 1893 and William Russell from 1894 to 1901. William Massey held the position from 1903, and by 1909 the opposition had coalesced into a new party known as the Reform Party under Massey's leadership.

Although the 1911 election saw Reform win 37 seats to the Liberal Party's 33, the balance of power was held by several independent Members of Parliament, who supported the Liberals. Over the next few months, however, enough switched sides for the Liberal government to lose a confidence vote, thus bringing Reform to power in July 1912.

1914 election and wartime coalition

Following the 1914 election, Reform held only 40 seats in the 80 seat parliament. By this time only one independent MP remained, the left-wing John Payne. Neither he nor the two small workers' parties (United Labour and Social Democrats) in parliament were likely to ally with the right-wing Reform Party.

However, the outbreak of World War I earlier in the year had created a need for national unity, and a hitherto unlikely coalition was formed between Reform and the party Reform had been set up to defeat, the Liberals. Massey retained his position as Prime Minister, with Liberal leader Joseph Ward becoming unofficial co-leader. Payne also supported the war, but both United Labour and the Social Democrats were against it, especially conscription. In 1916 they combined to form the New Zealand Labour Party, which became the official opposition. Several Labour MPs were jailed for their anti-conscription activities or for refusing military service.

1919 election

The coalition became increasingly difficult to manage, due partly to a personality clash between Massey and Ward. Following the end of the war in November 1918, the coalition dissolved, the two parties fought the subsequent election separately. Reform won an additional six seats, gaining a working majority at last.

1922 election

Economic problems had reduced the government's popularity, and the election left Reform with only 37 seats - four short of a majority. Massey was forced to cobble together a coalition of Reform, independents, and two Liberal MPs who were later rewarded with seats in the Legislative Council. The Labour Party was gaining considerable support, causing Massey to worry that it would soon supersede the Liberals.

1925 election

Labour continued to grow in popularity, and in the 1925 election gained more seats than the Liberals. The two parties were competing for many of the same voters, and for the anti-government vote in particular, and this worked to Reform's benefit. Although the party gained an additional 18 seats, its share of the vote rose by only 8.3%, suggesting that it benefitted from vote-splitting in many electorates.

1928 election

Following its disastrous performance in the 1925 election, the Liberal Party reconstituted itself as the United Party and regained some of its lost popularity. Reform and United each won 27 seats, with the Labour Party holding the balance of power with 19. Labour were long-term opponents of Reform and supported United, enabling United to take power.

Election results

Prime ministers
The government was led by William Massey from 10 July 1912 until his death on 10 May 1925. Francis Bell, who had earlier been Acting Prime Minister, briefly became Prime Minister (from 14 to 30 May 1925) but declined his party's offer of the job on a permanent basis. Gordon Coates was then appointed from 30 May 1925, and held the position until 10 December 1928, as his party was defeated in the 1928 general election.

Cabinet Ministers

See also
Governments of New Zealand
Reform Party (New Zealand)

References

Further reading

 

Ministries of George V
Governments of New Zealand
Reform Party (New Zealand)
20th century in New Zealand
1912 establishments in New Zealand
1928 disestablishments in New Zealand
Cabinets established in 1912
Cabinets disestablished in 1928